Watkins Glen State Park is in the village of Watkins Glen, south of Seneca Lake in Schuyler County in New York's Finger Lakes region. The park's lower part is near the village, while the upper part is open woodland. It was opened to the public in 1863 and was privately run as a tourist resort until 1906, when it was purchased by New York State. Initially known as Watkins Glen State Reservation, the park was first managed by the American Scenic and Historic Preservation Society before being turned over to full state control in 1911. Since 1924, it has been managed by the Finger Lakes Region of the New York State Office of Parks, Recreation and Historic Preservation.

The centerpiece of the  park is a  narrow gorge cut through rock by a stream—Glen Creek—that was left hanging when glaciers of the Ice age deepened the Seneca valley, increasing the tributary stream gradient to create rapids and waterfalls wherever there were layers of hard rock. The area's rocks are sedimentary of Devonian age, part of a dissected plateau that was uplifted with little faulting or distortion. They consist mostly of soft shales, with some layers of harder sandstone and limestone.

The park features three trails, open from mid-May to early November, by which one can climb or descend the gorge. The Southern Rim and Indian Trails run along the gorge's wooded rim, while the Gorge Trail is closest to the stream and runs over, under and along the park's 19 waterfalls by way of stone bridges and more than 800 stone steps. The trails connect to the Finger Lakes Trail, an  system of trails within New York state.

Activities and services
The park has comfortable camping sites, as well as picnic tables and pavilions, food, playground, a gift shop, pool, dump stations, showers, recreation programs, tent and trailer sites, fishing, hiking, hunting and cross-country skiing. The entrance fee for a day picnic is $8 per car.  The park is open year-round, but not all facilities are available at all times.

Geology

During the Pleistocene era, a vast area was covered by ice during the maximum extent of glacial ice in the north polar area. The movement of glaciers from the Laurentide and Wisconsin ice sheets shaped the Finger Lakes region. The lakes originated as a series of northward-flowing streams. Around two million years ago the first of many continental glaciers of the Laurentide Ice Sheet moved southward from the Hudson Bay area, initiating the Pleistocene glaciation. These glaciers widened, deepened and accentuated the existing river valleys. Glacial debris, possibly including terminal moraines, left behind by the receding ice acted as dams, allowing lakes to form. Despite the deep erosion of the valleys, the surrounding uplands show little evidence of glaciation, suggesting that the ice was thin, or at least unable to cause much erosion at these higher altitudes.

One such hanging valley, overlooking the south end of the Seneca Lake valley, evolved into the deep gorge of Watkins Glen. The steep drop of Glen Creek into Seneca Valley created a powerful torrent that eroded the underlying rock, cutting further and further back towards the stream's headwaters. This erosion was not a uniform process: the rock here includes shale, limestone, and sandstone, and these types of rock erode at different rates, leaving behind a staircase of waterfalls, cascades, plunge pools, and potholes.

See also
 List of New York state parks
 Watkins Glen International

References

External links

New York State Parks: Watkins Glen State Park
Watkins Glen

Glens of the United States
State parks of New York (state)
Campgrounds in New York (state)
Parks in Schuyler County, New York